David Richard Ellis (September 8, 1952 – January 7, 2013) was an American film director and stunt performer born in Santa Monica, California in 1952. His credits included dozens of films and television series including National Lampoon's Vacation, Baywatch, Lethal Weapon, and Patriot Games.

He also served as second unit director on blockbuster action films like Waterworld, Harry Potter and the Philosopher's Stone, The Matrix Reloaded, and Master and Commander: The Far Side of the World. His feature directorial credits included the action thriller Snakes on a Plane and two entries in the Final Destination series.

Career
Following a successful career as a junior pro surfer, David Richard Ellis began his career in the film industry as a supporting actor in juvenile roles making his big screen debut in 1975 in the Kurt Russell film The Strongest Man in the World. In 1978, he received a promotion to stunt coordinator on The Invasion of the Body Snatchers. After several successful years in this position, he worked from 1986 onwards as a second unit director before making his debut as a director in the Disney live-action film Homeward Bound II: Lost in San Francisco. He is best known for directing two of the Final Destination films and the 2006 film Snakes on a Plane, which became an Internet phenomenon.

As a stunt man he was best known for his work in the movie Scarface. Other notable works as a stunt man include Fatal Attraction, Lethal Weapon, the television series Baywatch, and Patriot Games. As a second unit director he worked on a number of well-known movies that include Harry Potter and the Philosopher's Stone, The Matrix Reloaded, Master and Commander: The Far Side of the World, and Cop Out. At the time of his death, two works involving Ellis were still in post-production: 47 Ronin and R.I.P.D.; another, Winter's Tale, was still being filmed. R.I.P.D. was released in July 2013; 47 Ronin was released in December 2013, while Winter's Tale was released in  February 2014.

He was perhaps best known as a director with seven titles under his belt. Homeward Bound II: Lost in San Francisco, Final Destination 2, Cellular, Snakes on a Plane, Asylum, The Final Destination, and Shark Night. At the time of his death, he was in pre-production for a live-action version of the violent anime Kite. Ralph Ziman became the film's director.

Ellis was nominated for the Taurus Award along with Glenn Boswell and R. A. Rondell in 2003 for his stunt coordination work on The Matrix Reloaded. Ellis was a member and served as vice president for an elite stunt performance organization known as Stunts Unlimited located in Sherman Oaks, California.

Personal life
David R. Ellis was the father of producer Tawny, photographer Cheyenne Ellis, and UC Irvine English Instructor, Tagert Ellis. He was the son of Richard and Andrea Ellis, the grandfather to Kodiak and Ridge Ellis, as well as the brother of Annie, Lori, and Chenoa Ellis. He is survived by his wife Cindy.

When Ellis was once about to be carjacked, trapped between two other cars, he used his stunt-driving prowess to whip his car out of the tiny gap and face the carjackers, revving his engine, scaring them enough to get back into their cars and drive away.

Death
On January 7, 2013, Ellis's body was found in the bathroom of his hotel room in Johannesburg, South Africa. He was preparing to direct Kite at the time. No cause of death has been released; police say no foul play was suspected.

Filmography

Director

Second unit director

Actor

Stunts

References

External links

 

1952 births
2013 deaths
Film directors from California
People from Santa Monica, California
American male child actors
Horror film directors